The Peel Sessions is an EP by Irish indie rock band. It was released by That Petrol Emotion in 1987.

Track listing 

 V2   ((John O'Neill)) - 3:56 
 Lettuce   (John O'Neill) - 2:15 
 Blind Spot   ((John O'Neill)) - 4:12 
 Can't Stop   (John O'Neill/Raymond Gorman) - 2:45

Personnel
The following people worked on the EP:
 Steve Mack: Vocals
 John O'Neill: Guitar
 Raymond Gorman: Guitar
 Damian O'Neill: Bass
 Ciaran McLaughlin: Drums

References 

1985 EPs